In 3D computer graphics, the image plane is that plane in the world which is identified with the plane of the display monitor used to view the image that is being rendered. It is also referred to as screen space. If one makes the analogy of taking a photograph to rendering a 3D image, the surface of the film is the image plane. In this case, the viewing transformation is a projection that maps the world onto the image plane. A rectangular region of this plane, called the viewing window or viewport, maps to the monitor. This establishes the mapping between pixels on the monitor and points (or rather, rays) in the 3D world. The plane is not usually an actual geometric object in a 3D scene, but instead is usually a collection of target coordinates or dimensions that are used during the rasterization process so the final output can be displayed as intended on the physical screen.

In optics, the image plane is the plane that contains the object's projected image, and lies beyond the back focal plane.

See also
 Focal plane
 Picture plane
 Projection plane
 Real image

References

External links 
 

3D computer graphics
Planes (geometry)